The 2009 Ontario Scotties Tournament of Hearts was the 2009 edition of the provincial women's curling tournament in the province of Ontario, Canada. It was held January 26-February 1 at the Oakville Curling Club in Oakville. The winning team represented Ontario at the 2009 Scotties Tournament of Hearts in Victoria, British Columbia, where it finished tied for sixth.

Teams

* Skip (calls the game) but throws lead rocks.

Standings

Results

Draw 1
January 26, 1400

Draw 2
January 26, 1915

Draw 3
January 27, 1400

Draw 4
January 27, 1900

Draw 5
January 28, 1400

Draw 6
January 28, 1900

Draw 7
January 29, 1400

Draw 8
January 29, 1900

Draw 9
January 30, 1400

Tie breakers
January 30, 1900

January 31, 0900

Playoffs

3 vs. 4
January 31, 1400

1 vs. 2
January 31, 1400

Semi-final
January 31, 1900

Final
February 1, 1400

Qualification
The tournament will consist of ten teams. Since there is no Northern Ontario team at the Scotties, the provincial tournament must consist of the entire province of Ontario. The provincial finals will consist of four teams from Northern Ontario and six from Southern Ontario. The four Northern Ontario teams qualify from one playdown, while the six Southern Ontario teams qualify from a series of zone and regional playdowns. Two teams qualify from each of the two Southern Ontario regions, while two teams come from a provincial "last chance" qualification tournament. The two regions consist of eight zones where two teams from which qualify for the regional tournaments.

Southern Ontario Zones
Teams in bold advanced to regionals. Teams underlined opted to play in the challenge round.

Zone 1
December 7, Navan Curling Club (Navan)

Teams:
Jenn Hanna (Ottawa)
Raja Wysocki (Winchester)
Barb Kelly (Russell)

Zone 2
December 20-21, Rideau Curling Club (Ottawa)

Teams:
Cheryl McBain (Rideau)
Katrina Carr (Rideau)
Allison Farrell (Rideau)
Carole Fujimoto (Rideau)
Jacqueline Harrison (Rideau)

Zone 3
December 20-21, Carleton Place Curling Club (Carleton Place)

Teams:
Susan Schmidt (Granite of West Ottawa)
Tracy Samaan (Pakenham)
Debra Karbashewski (Carleton Place)

Zone 4
Originally scheduled for December 19-21, Royal Kingston Curling Club (Kingston)

Teams:
Allie Wood (Cataraqui)
Rhonda Varnes (Rideau) (Transferred from Zone 2 to fill vacancy)

Zone 5
December 6, Bobcaygeon Curling Club (Bobcaygeon)

Teams:
Cathy Stakie (Bobcaygeon)
Denna Bagshaw (Cannington)
Angie Melaney (Lakefield)
Lisa Farnell (Peterborough)

Zone 6
December 6-7, Annandale Country Club (Ajax)

Teams:
Lianne Robertson (Tam Heather)
Janet McGhee (Uxbridge)
Sara Harvey (Whitby)
Christine Pierce (Unionville)

Zone 7
December 20-21, Richmond Hill Curling Club (Richmond Hill)

Teams:
Chris Anderson (Leaside)
Julie Hastings (Bayview)
Alison Goring (Bayview)
JoAnn Inouye (York)
Karri-Lee Grant (Thornhill)

Zone 8
December 20-21, Mississaugua Golf & Country Club (Mississauga)

Teams:
Ann Pearson (Oakville)
Kelly Cochrane (High Park)
Chrissy Cadorin (Mississaugua)

Zone 9
December 6, Markdale Golf & Curling Club (Markdale)

Teams:
Susan Froud (Alliston)
Kristy Russell (Orangeville)

Zone 10
December 20, Penetanguishene Curling Club (Penetanguishene)

Teams:
Carrie Lindner (Bradford)
Sherry Middaugh (Coldwater)
Heather Marshall (Stroud)

Zone 11
Originally scheduled December 5-7, Southampton Curling Club (Southampton)

Teams:
Suzanne Boudreault (Port Elgin)
Anne Dunn (Galt Country) [brought in from Zone 12]

Zone 12
December 6-7, Westmount Golf & Country Club (Kitchener)

Teams:
Anne Dunn (Galt Country) [See Zone 11]
Kathy Brown (Guelph)
Dawn Sherk (Guelph)
Kathy Ryan (Kitchener-Waterloo Granite)
Taylor Mellor (Kitchener-Waterloo Granite)

Zone 13
December 20-21, Burlington Golf & Country Club (Burlington)

Teams:
Christine Rettie (Dundas Granite)
Stacey Brandwood (Glendale)
Margie Hewitt (St. Catharines Golf)
Brit O'Neill (St. Catharines Golf)

Zone 14
December 6, Teeswater Curling Club (Teeswater)

Teams:
Joyce Millen (Teeswater)
Karen Bell (Listowel)
Amy Mackay (Listowel)
Kaylene Rundle (Exeter)

Zone 15
Originally scheduled December 19-21, Stratford Country Club (Stratford)

Teams:
Tara Maxwell (Brant)
Julie Reddick (Brant)

Zone 16
December 5-7, Forest Curling & Social Club (Forest)

Teams:
Amie Shackleton (Ilderton)
Kimberley Tuck (Ilderton)
Harmony Simmons (Sarnia)
Bridget Arnold (Sarnia)
Ruth Alexander (Highland)

Southern Ontario Regions
All on January 9-11 weekend

Region 1&2 (Zones 1-8)
Land O'Lakes Curling Club, Marmora

Region 3&4 (Zones 9-16)
Norwich District Curling Club, Norwich

Southern Ontario Challenge Round
The challenge round will be held January 16-19 at the Bradford & District Curling Club in Bradford to determine the last two spots.

Northern Ontario Region
The Northern Ontario playdown was held January 7-11 at the Port Arthur Curling Club in Thunder Bay.

Teams:
Tracy Horgan (Idylwylde)
Dawn Schwar (Sudbury)
Lisa Foulds (Fort William)
Christine Eby-Jean (Fort William)
Krista McCarville (Fort William)
Krista Mayrand (Cochrane)
Kelly McLellan (Soo Curlers)
Crystal Wojtowicz (Kenora)
Ashley Miharija (Port Arthur)

B-side play in: Mayrand def. Wojtowich

C side Qualifier #1

C side qualifier 2

External links
Oakville Curling Club
Official site

Ontario
Oakville, Ontario
Ontario Scotties Tournament of Hearts
Ontario Scotties